Filkin may refer to:

Elizabeth Filkin  (born 1940), British civil servant, Parliamentary Commissioner for Standards 1999–2002
Geoffrey Filkin, Baron Filkin (born 1944), British Labour Party politician, former government minister

See also
 Filkins, a village in Oxfordshire